Sir Frederick Joseph Bramwell, 1st Baronet FRS FRSA (17 March 1818 – 30 November 1903) was a British civil and mechanical engineer. He became a Fellow of the Royal Society in 1873 and served as president of the Institution of Civil Engineers between December 1884 and May 1886 and the president of the British Association for the Advancement of Science in 1888. He was knighted in 1881 and created a baronet on 25 January 1889.

Bramwell trained as an engineer and studied steam propulsion. In 1843 he constructed a locomotive for the Stockton and Darlington Railway; set up his own business concentrating on legal and consultative work (1853). He was the first engineer to practise as a technical advocate and later was adviser to the London water companies.

Family

He was the son of George Bramwell, a partner in Dorrien and Co. Bankers, and his wife Harriet, and the younger brother of Sir George William Wilshere Bramwell. He married on 29 March 1847, Harriet Leonara Frith (his cousin), daughter of Joseph Frith. There were three daughters to the marriage, with Eldred marrying the scientist, Sir Victor Horsley.

Bramwell died of a cerebral haemorrhage on 30 November 1903, in London, and was buried at Hever, Kent.

Works
 Our big guns (1886, address to the Birmingham and Midland Institute) from his work as a civilian member of the Ordnance Committee.

References

External links
 
 
 

1818 births
1903 deaths
British mechanical engineers
Presidents of the Institution of Civil Engineers
Presidents of the Smeatonian Society of Civil Engineers
Fellows of the Royal Society
Baronets in the Baronetage of the United Kingdom
Presidents of the British Science Association
Knights Bachelor